Aleksei Yuryevich Kolomiychenko (born 12 July 1982) is a Russian professional football player. He plays for FC Dnepr Kholm-Zhirkovsky.

Club career
He made his Russian Football National League debut for FC Kristall Smolensk on 29 March 2003 in a game against FC Lada-Tolyatti. Overall, he played 12 seasons in the FNL for 6 clubs.

External links
 
 

1982 births
People from Yartsevo
Living people
Russian footballers
Association football midfielders
FC Kristall Smolensk players
FC Khimki players
FC Anzhi Makhachkala players
FC Avangard Kursk players
FC Baltika Kaliningrad players
FC Volgar Astrakhan players
Sportspeople from Smolensk Oblast